Judge Kenneth Peterson (December 13, 1964 – May 17, 2020), known professionally as Lucky Peterson, was an American musician who played contemporary blues, fusing soul, R&B, gospel and rock and roll.  He played guitar and keyboards. Music journalist Tony Russell, in his book The Blues - From Robert Johnson to Robert Cray has said, "he may be the only blues musician to have had national television exposure in short pants."

Biography
Peterson's father, bluesman James Peterson, owned a nightclub in Buffalo called The Governor's Inn. The club was a regular stop for fellow bluesmen such as Willie Dixon. Dixon saw a five-year-old Lucky Peterson performing at the club and, in Peterson's words, "Took me under his wing." Months later, Peterson performed on The Tonight Show, The Ed Sullivan Show and What's My Line?. Millions of people watched Peterson sing "1-2-3-4", a cover version of "Please, Please, Please" by James Brown. At the time, Peterson said "his father wrote it". Around this time he recorded his first album, Our Future: 5 Year Old Lucky Peterson, for Today/Perception Records and appeared on the public television show, Soul!.

As a teen, Peterson studied at the Buffalo Academy for Visual and Performing Arts, where he played the French horn with the school symphony. Soon, he was playing backup guitar and keyboards for Etta James, Bobby "Blue" Bland, and Little Milton.

The 1990s were a prolific period for Peterson.  Two solo Bob Greenlee produced albums for the Chicago-based Alligator Records (1989's Lucky Strikes!, and the following year's Triple Play) remain his finest recorded offerings. He then released four more for the Verve record label, (I'm Ready, Beyond Cool, Lifetime, and Move). While with Verve, Peterson collaborated with Mavis Staples on a tribute to gospel singer Mahalia Jackson, called Spirituals & Gospel.  Peterson played electronic organ behind Staples' singing.

More albums from Peterson came after 2000.  He recorded two for Blue Thumb (Lucky Peterson, and Double Dealin), and one for Disques Dreyfus entitled, Black Midnight Sun. In 2007, he released Tête à Tête on JSP Records.

In 2013, the Blackbird Music/55 Arts Club DVD of Live At The 55 Arts Club Berlin was nominated for a Blues Music Award.

Peterson was a favorite of Louisiana bred blues star Kenny Neal, and Peterson's organ and piano work shines on six of Neal's albums between 1989 and 2015.

Personal life
Peterson lived in Dallas, Texas, and maintained a rigorous tour schedule performing all over the world. He had four children. He died on May 17, 2020, in Dallas at age 55. According to French music critic and journalist Alex Dutihl,  Peterson died of a massive brain hemorrhage after falling ill at home.

Discography

1969: Our Future: 5 Year Old Lucky Peterson – Today TLP-1002
1972: The Father, The Son, The Blues (with James Peterson) – Today TLP-1011
1984: Ridin'  – Evidence 26033; originally issued on Isabel 900.519 [LP] and IS-919.2 [CD].
1989: Lucky Strikes! – Alligator 4770
1991: Triple Play – Alligator 4789
1993: I'm Ready – Verve 517513
1994: Beyond Cool – Verve 521147
1996: Lifetime – Verve 531202
1996: Spirituals & Gospel: Dedicated to Mahalia Jackson (with Mavis Staples) – Verve 533562
1998: Move – Verve 537897
1999: Lucky Peterson – Blue Thumb/Verve 547433
2001: Double Dealin'  – Blue Thumb/Verve 549475
2003: Black Midnight Sun – Dreyfus 36643
2004: If You Can't Fix It (with James Peterson) – JSP 8816
2006: Lay My Demons Down (with Tommy McCoy) – Blues Boulevard 250232; originally issued on Green Swamp.
2007: Tête à Tête (with Andy Aledort, Larry McCray) – JSP 8805
2009: Organ Soul Sessions – Emarcy/Universal (France) 5313798 [3-CD set]; also available individually as Brother Where Are You? (5313801), Mercy (5313800), and The Music is the Magic (5313799).
2009: Darling Forever (with Tamara Peterson) – JSP 8814
2010: Heart of Pain – JSP 8824
2010: You Can Always Turn Around – Dreyfus 36967
2011: Every Second a Fool is Born – JSP 8831
2012: Live at the 55 Arts Club Berlin (with Tamara Peterson) – Blackbird Music 201209 [2CD]
2013: Whatever You Say (with Tamara Peterson) – JSP 8848
2014: I'm Back Again – Blues Boulevard 250357 (a single disc compilation of the 55 Arts Club set)
2014: The Son of a Bluesman – Jazz Village 570035
2014: Travelin' Man – JSP 8854
2015: July 28, 2014: Live in Marciac – Jazz Village 570076
2016: Long Nights – JSP 3001
2017: What Have I Done Wrong: The Best of the JSP Studio Sessions – JSP 3009 (compilation)
2017: Tribute to Jimmy Smith – Jazz Village 570135
2019: 50 – Just Warming Up! – Jazz Village 570165With Carey Bell1995: Deep Down – Alligator 4828With Kenny Neal'''
1989: Devil Child – Alligator 4774
1991: Walkin' on Fire – Alligator 4795
2015: Bayou Blood – Alligator 4809
1994: Hoodoo Moon – Alligator 4825
2008: Let Life Flow – Blind Pig 5122
2010: Hooked on Your Love'' – Blind Pig 5137

See also
Long Beach Blues Festival

References

External links
[ Lucky Peterson biography] at Allmusic website
Lucky Peterson Official Website at www.luckypeterson.com
 

1964 births
2020 deaths
African-American guitarists
American blues singers
American blues guitarists
American male guitarists
Musicians from Buffalo, New York
Singers from New York (state)
Contemporary blues musicians
Guitarists from New York (state)
20th-century American guitarists
20th-century American male musicians
21st-century American keyboardists
21st-century American male musicians
JSP Records artists
Alligator Records artists
20th-century African-American musicians
21st-century African-American musicians